The 2019–20 Iowa State Cyclones women's basketball team represented Iowa State University during the 2019–20 NCAA Division I women's basketball season. The Cyclones were coached by Bill Fennelly, who was in his 25th season at Iowa State. They played their home games at Hilton Coliseum in Ames, Iowa as members of the Big 12 Conference.

They finished the season 18–11, 10–8 in Big 12 play to finish in a tie for fourth place. The Big 12 Tournament, NCAA women's basketball tournament and WNIT were all cancelled before they began due to the COVID-19 pandemic.

Previous season

The Cyclones finished the 2019–19 season 26–9, 13–5 in Big 12 play to finish in second place. They advanced to the championship game of the Big 12 women's tournament where they lost to Baylor. They received at-large bid of the NCAA women's tournament defeated New Mexico State in the first round before getting upset by Missouri State in the second round.

Roster

Schedule and results
Source:

|-
!colspan=12 style=| Exhibition

|-
!colspan=12 style=| Non-conference regular season

|-
!colspan=12 style=| Big 12 Conference Season

|-
!colspan=12 style=| Big 12 Tournament

Rankings

Coaches' Poll did not release a second poll at the same time as the AP.

Awards and honors

See also
2019–20 Iowa State Cyclones men's basketball team

References

Iowa State Cyclones women's basketball seasons
Iowa State
Iowa State Cyc
Iowa State Cyc